Axiocerses melanica is a butterfly in the family Lycaenidae. It is found in Zambia. The habitat consists of moist woodland.

Adults have been recorded in October, November, February, March and April.

Subspecies
Axiocerses melanica melanica (central Zambia)
Axiocerses melanica aurata Henning & Henning, 1996 (north-western Zambia)

References

Butterflies described in 1996
Axiocerses
Endemic fauna of Zambia
Butterflies of Africa